The Serbs of Sarajevo numbered 157,526 according to the 1991 census, making up more than 30% of the Sarajevo Metropolitan area (10 pre-war municipalities; Centar, Stari Grad, Novo Sarajevo, Novi Grad, Ilidza, Ilijas, Vogosca, Hadzici, Trnovo, and Pale. Today, following the Bosnian War, few Serbs remain in central areas of Sarajevo; however, many parts of the pre-war metropolitan area are now forming the city of East Sarajevo in Republika Srpska; namely, Pale RS, East Ilidza, East Novo Sarajevo, Trnovo RS, and East Stari Grad. Most have either moved abroad, to Serbia or other countries, or moved to a new settlement on the outskirts of Sarajevo, located in the Republika Srpska, known as East Sarajevo (previously Srpsko Sarajevo - Serbian Sarajevo).

History

World War I
After the assassination of Archduke Franz Ferdinand of Austria and Sophie, Duchess of Hohenberg, Anti-Serb rioting took place in Sarajevo on 28 and 29 June 1914, incited by Austro-Hungarian authorities. Two Serbs, Pero Prijavić and Nikola Nožičić, died some days later as a result of the injuries they sustained after they were beaten and a total of fifty people were treated at Sarajevo hospitals following the two-day rioting. Whole stocks of goods as well as monies from Serb shops and homes were gone due to the plundering. The devastation left a profound impact on Serb-owned business and industry given the minority Sarajevo Serb population's prominence in those areas.

World War II
During WWII, Serbs living in the Independent State of Croatia (NDH), a German-installed puppet state, were subjected to genocide by the Croatian fascist Ustaše regime. In the summer of 1941, Ustaše militia periodically interned and executed groups of Sarajevo Serbs. In August 1941, they arrested about one hundred Serbs suspected of ties to the resistance armies, mostly church officials and members of the intelligentsia, and executed them or deported them to concentration camps. The Ustaše killed at least 323 people in the Villa Luburić, a slaughter house and place for torturing and imprisoning Serbs, Jews and political dissidents.

Bosnian war
On 1 March 1992, a Bosnian Serb wedding procession in Sarajevo's Baščaršija quarters was attacked, resulting in the shooting death of the father of the groom, Nikola Gardović, and the wounding of a Serbian Orthodox priest. The attack took place on the last day of a controversial referendum on Bosnia and Herzegovina's independence from Yugoslavia, in the early stages of the breakup of Yugoslavia and the Yugoslav Wars. Gardović, an ethnic Serb, is often regarded as the first casualty of the Bosnian war.

During the siege of Sarajevo, Bosniak paramilitary leader Mušan Topalović and his forces abducted and killed mostly Serbs living in and around Sarajevo before Bosnian police killed Topalović in October 1993. A pit on the outskirts of the city was used as an execution site and a mass grave for Serbs who were rounded up, beaten and killed, sometimes by having their throats slit and decapitated. The total number of victims killed is not known, with estimates ranging from a few dozen to some hundreds. The actions of paramilitary units led many thousands of Serbs to flee the city, particularly in the summer of 1992. By war's end, the number of Serbs in Sarajevo was estimated to be in the low tens of thousands, fewer than 20% of those who had lived in the city in 1991.

After the signing of the Dayton accords, a mass exodus of Sarajevo Serbs took place in early 1996 numbering an estimated 62,000.

Churches
There are three main Serbian Orthodox places of worship in Sarajevo: the Old Orthodox Church ( or ), dating back to the 16th century, the Cathedral Church (Саборна црква or Saborna crkva), which was erected in the 1860s, and the Church of Sveto Preobraženje in Novo Sarajevo.

Notable people
 

Notable Serbs who were born in or lived in Sarajevo include: 
Manojlo Jeftanović, merchant
Sima Milutinović Sarajlija
Bishop Georgije (Đorđe Nikolajević), theology professor, Orthodox priest, and monk, Dabar-Bosnia Metropolitan bishop (1885-1896)
Jovan Marinović, politician and diplomat, Principality of Serbia President of the Ministry (1873-1874)
Dimitrije Jeftanović, merchant and industrialist
Petrakija "Petro" Petrović, merchant
Hadži Makso Despić, fur merchant
Mićo Despić, fur merchant
Stevo Petranović, schoolteacher, dramaturgist, and translator
Sava Kosanović, theologist, schoolteacher, Orthodox priest, and monk, Dabar-Bosnia Metropolitan bishop (1881-1885)
Bishop Nikolaj (Petar Mandić), theologist, Orthodox priest, and monk, Dabar-Bosnia Metropolitan bishop (1896-1907)
Gligorije Jeftanović, merchant, industrialist, and politician, Hotel Evropa owner (1882-1927)
Bishop Evgenije (Manojlo Letica), lawyer and Orthodox monk, Dabar-Bosnia Metropolitan bishop (1907-1920)
Nikola T. Kašiković, writer and publisher, Bosanska vila owner and editor-in-chief
Hieromartyr Petar (Jovan Zimonjić), theology professor and Orthodox monk, Dabar-Bosnia Metropolitan bishop (1920-1941), canonized as hieromartyr in 1998
Vladislav Skarić, tobacco merchant, historian, geographer, and SANU academician
Bishop Nektarije (Nikola Krulj), Juris Utriusque Doctor, theology professor, and Orthodox monk, Dabar-Bosnia Metropolitan bishop (1951-1966)
Jevto Dedijer, geographer
Vojislav "Đedo" Kecmanović, Balkan Wars volunteer soldier, World War II Partisan, and post-war communist politician
Lazar Drljača, painter
Dušan Jeftanović, merchant, industrialist, and juris doctor, Hotel Evropa owner (1927-1941)
Bogdan Žerajić, revolutionary
Veljko Čubrilović, Young Bosnia revolutionary
Đoko Mazalić, painter
Petar Tiješić, painter
Ljubica Stefanović, theater actress
Stanko Luka Karaman, biologist
Vladimir Gaćinović, writer and revolutionary
Danilo Ilić, Young Bosnia revolutionary
Feodor Lukač, surgeon and football pioneer
Jelena Kešeljević, theater actress
Gavrilo Princip, Young Bosnia revolutionary
Nedeljko Čabrinović, Young Bosnia revolutionary
Dobroslav Jevđević, politician and World War II Chetnik leader
Trifko Grabež, Young Bosnia revolutionary
Cvjetko Popović, Young Bosnia revolutionary
Vojislav Bogićević, Young Bosnia revolutionary and historian
Roman Petrović, painter
Vaso Čubrilović, Young Bosnia revolutionary
Jezdimir Dangić, Young Bosnia revolutionary, lawyer, Yugoslav Gendarmerie sub-lieutenant, and World War II Chetnik
Đuro Pucar, World War II Partisan leader and post-war communist politician
Rodoljub Čolaković, World War II Partisan leader and post-war communist politician
Aleksa "Brko" Bojović, World War II Partisan
Vlado Šegrt, World War II Partisan leader and post-war communist politician
Boriša "Šćepan" Kovačević, World War II Partisan
Dušan Pajić-Dašić, World War II Partisan leader
Erih Koš, lawyer and writer
Bishop Vladislav (Vojislav Mitrović), schoolteacher, theology professor, and Orthodox monk, Dabar-Bosnia Metropolitan bishop (1967-1992)
Vukašin Milošević, Mechanical and Energetics Engineer
Gliša Janković, World War II Partisan
Slobodan "Seljo" Princip, World War II Partisan leader
Miladin Radojević, World War II Partisan
Rato Dugonjić, World War II Partisan leader and post-war communist politician
Vaso "Crni" Miskin, World War II Partisan
Milan Rajlić, football player
Radojka Lakić, World War II Partisan
Branko "Obren" Milutinović, World War II Partisan
Vladimir "Valter" Perić, World War II Partisan leader
Rava Janković, World War II Partisan
Ljubo Kojo, World War II Partisan, mayor of Sarajevo 1955-1962
Lazo Materić, World War II Partisan, mayor of Sarajevo 1962-1963
Bane Šurbat, World War II Partisan leader
Dara Dragišić, World War II Partisan
Branko Stanković, footballer and football coach
Vaso Radić, World War II Partisan, mayor of Sarajevo 1963-1965
Dragutin "Braco" Kosovac, World War II Partisan, post-war communist politician, and state-appointed business manager (CEO of Energoinvest)
Aleksandar "Aca" Nikolić, basketball coach
Dane Maljković, electrical engineer, mayor of Sarajevo 1973-1975
Milorad Ekmečić, historian
Milanko Renovica, communist politician
Bishop Nikolaj (Gojko Mrđa), theologist and Orthodox monk, Dabar-Bosnia Metropolitan bishop (1992-present)
Nikola Milošević, political philosopher
Predrag Palavestra, writer and literary historian
Biljana Plavšić, biologist and politician, convicted for crimes against humanity
Toma Kuruzović, actor
Duško Trifunović, poet and writer
Obrad Piljak, banker and communist politician
Boro Drašković, playwright and film director
Predrag Golubović, film director
Dimitrije Bjelica, chess player
Nikola Koljević, scholar and politician
Momo Kapor, writer
Uglješa Uzelac, economist and sports administrator, mayor of Sarajevo 1983-1985
Svetozar Vujović, football player
Boriša Starović, surgeon, UofS medical faculty dean (1988-1992), UIS medical faculty dean (1993-2005), UIS rector (2000-2005)
Kornelije Kovač, musician and composer
Boško Antić, football player and football coach
Momčilo Krajišnik, politician, convicted for crimes against humanity
Rajko Nogo, poet
Blagoje Bratić, football player and football coach
Nenad Kecmanović, academician
Vladimir "Čobi" Savčić, singer
Braco Dimitrijević, artist
Svetislav Pešić, basketball player and basketball coach
Dragan Kalinić, politician
Mladen Savović, structural engineer
Milić Vukašinović, musician
Goran Bregović, musician
Neda Ukraden, singer
Božo Janković, football player
Zdravko Čolić, singer
Slobodan "Čobo" Janjuš, football goalkeeper
Mila Mulroney, First Lady of Canada 1984-1993
Želimir "Keli" Vidović, football player
Vojislav Šešelj, politician
Mladen Materić, dramaturgist and theater director
Emir Kusturica, film director
Ipe Ivandić, musician
Nikola Nikić, football player
Aleksandar Obradović, journalist
Ljiljana Smajlović, journalist, Politika editor-in-chief 2005-2008, 2013-present
Ratko Radovanović, basketball player and basketball administrator
Milomir Ninković, plastic, reconstructive, and hand surgeon, Klinikum Bogenhausen
Boris Tadić, President of Serbia 2004-2012
Dragan Đokanović, politician, physician, sportsman
Predrag Pašić, football player
Željko Lukajić, basketball coach
Vladimir Pištalo, writer, 2008 NIN Prize winner
Vlado Čapljić, football player
Dragan Škrba, football goalkeeper
Nele Karajlić, singer, actor, and TV personality
Nebojša Novaković, football player and football coach
Vesna Mišanović, chess player
Gorčin Stojanović, film and television director
Srđan Koljević, screenplay writer and film director
Isidora Bjelica, writer
Dragan "Maca" Marinković, actor and TV presenter
Predrag Danilović, basketball player, KK Partizan president 2007-present
Rade Bogdanović, football player
Vladimir Kecmanović, novelist
Ognjen Tadić, politician
Haris Brkić, basketball player
Goran Trobok, football player
Nenad Mišković, football player
Dušan Vukčević, basketball player
Predrag Materić, basketball player
Veselin Petrović, basketball player
Neven Pajkić, boxer
Ognjen Koroman, football player
Ognjen Aškrabić, basketball player
Đorđe Babalj, football player
Aleksandar Ćapin, basketball player
Aleksej Nešović, basketball player
Danina Jeftić, actress
Zoran Čegar, police officer
Momo Savović, Prof. School of Architecture, San Diego, CA
 Danko Borkovic, Juris Doctor, Attorney, Tampa, FL.

See also 
Sarajevo Old Orthodox Church
Serbian Orthodox Cathedral in Sarajevo
Serbs of Bosnia and Herzegovina
Exodus of Sarajevo Serbs

References

External links 
Prosvjeta - Serb Cultural Society
Serbian Orthodox Mitropolitanate of Dabro-Bosnia
Official site of the Old Orthodox Church

Sarajevo
 Serb